RGP may refer to:

 The National Rail code for Reading Green Park railway station, under construction in Reading, England
 Redemption grace period, to reclaim a lost domain name
 Resources Global Professionals, a company
 Revolutionary Goans Party, a political party in Goa, India
 Rigid gas permeable, a type of contact lens
 Rimba Grand Prix, fictional auto-racing company in Rimba Racer
 Royal Gibraltar Police
 Gingipain R, an enzyme
 RGP (duo), South Korean reggae duo